Flash proxy is a pluggable transport and  proxy which runs in a web browser. Flash proxies are an Internet censorship circumvention tool which enables users to connect to the Tor anonymity network (amongst others) via a plethora of ephemeral browser-based proxy relays. The essential idea is that the IP addresses contingently used are changed faster than a censoring agency can detect, track, and block them. The Tor traffic is wrapped in a WebSocket format and disguised with an XOR cipher.

Implementation
A free software implementation of flash proxies is available. It uses JavaScript, WebSocket, and a Python implementation of the obfsproxy protocol, and was crafted by the Security Project in Computer Security at Stanford University. This work was supported by the Defense Advanced Research Project Agency (DARPA) and the Space and Naval Warfare Systems Center Pacific under Contract No. N66001-11-C-4022.

See also

 Crypto-anarchism
 Cryptocat
 CryptoParty
 Freedom of information
 Internet censorship
 Internet privacy
 Proxy server

References

External links
 The primary developer gives an overview at Stanford University

Free routing software
Cryptographic software
Anonymity networks
Internet privacy
Proxy servers
Free network-related software
Free software programmed in Python